Pape Ndiaga Yade (born 5 January 2000) is a Senegalese professional footballer who plays as a forward for  club Troyes on loan from Metz.

Club career
On 15 August 2019, Yade signed a professional contract with FC Metz for five seasons. He made his professional debut with FC Metz in a 1–1 (3–4) Coupe de la Ligue penalty shootout loss to Brest on 30 October 2019.

On 25 August 2022, Yade joined Troyes on loan until the end of the 2022–23 season, with an option to buy.

References

External links
 
 
 FC Metz Profile

2000 births
Living people
Sportspeople from Saint-Louis, Senegal
Senegalese footballers
Association football forwards
Ligue 1 players
Ligue 2 players
Championnat National 3 players
FC Metz players
ES Troyes AC players
Senegalese expatriate footballers
Senegalese expatriate sportspeople in France
Expatriate footballers in France